Thomas Howard Carr (July 4, 1907 - April 23, 1997) was an American actor and film director of Hollywood movies and television programs. Often billed as "Tommy Carr", he later adopted his more formal "Thomas Carr" birth name as his billing name.

Biography
Carr was born into an acting family on July 4, 1907 in Philadelphia, Pennsylvania. His father was the actor William Carr and his mother was the actress Mary Carr.  Thomas Carr followed the family profession, and in 1915 began acting in silent films.  From 1915 through 1953, Carr played small supporting roles in a number of low budget Hollywood films. However, Carr's star as an actor did not rise.

In 1945, he turned to directing, and from 1945 through 1951 Carr directed numerous B movies for Hollywood's poverty row.  Most of Carr's films were Westerns; however, in 1948 he was co-director (along with Spencer Gordon Bennet) of the live-action Superman serial.  From 1951 to 1968, Carr's directing was focused mainly on television.  He directed episodes of numerous television shows in the 1950s and 1960s, including episodes of Lassie, Adventures of Superman, Daniel Boone, Wanted: Dead or Alive, and Gunsmoke.

His older brother Stephen was a recurring cast member, in various roles, during the first season of Adventures of Superman. Steve is also seen pointing "up in the sky" during the opening credits of the black and white episodes.

Thomas Carr retired from directing in 1968.  He died in Ventura, California on 23 April 1997.

Partial filmography

Velvet Fingers (1920) (as a young actor)
A Heart to Let (1921) (as a young actor)
Polly of the Follies (1922) (actor)
The Road to Ruin (1928) (actor)
Men Without Law (1930) (actor)
The Cherokee Flash (1945)
Alias Billy the Kid (1946)
The El Paso Kid (1946)
Red River Renegades (1946)
Jesse James Rides Again (1947)
Song of the Wasteland (1947)
Brick Bradford (1947)
Superman (1948)
Congo Bill (1948)
The Maverick (1952)
Captain Scarlett (1953)
The Desperado (1954)
Dino (1957)
The Tall Stranger (1957)
 Cast a Long Shadow (1959)

Bibliography
 Holmstrom, John. The Moving Picture Boy: An International Encyclopaedia from 1895 to 1995, Norwich, Michael Russell, 1996, p. 30.

External links 
 
  Tommy Carr in middle age,signed portrait(archived)

1907 births
1997 deaths
American film directors
American male film actors
Male actors from Philadelphia
20th-century American male actors
Male Western (genre) film actors